The men's 50 metre freestyle event at the 2005 World Aquatics Championships was held on 29 (heats and semifinals) and 30 July 2005 at the Parc Jean-Drapeau in Montreal, Canada.

Records
Prior to the championships, the following world and World Championship records were listed by FINA.

The following records were established during the competition:

Results

Heats

Swim-off

Semifinals

Final

References

Swimming at the 2005 World Aquatics Championships